FC Sportakademklub Moscow is a Russian professional association football club, based in Moscow.

Despite finishing outside the Russian First Division relegation zone in 2008 (the only season the team spent in the second-tier competition), the club could not afford to participate in the 2009 season in the division and volunteered to get relegated to the Russian Second Division for 2009 season. In 2010 season they were relegated from the Russian Second Division to the amateur fourth-tier Amateur Football League.

Before 1997 the team was called FC Mashinostroitel and represented Sergiyev Posad.

It played professionally overall from 1994 to 2010.

See also
 Higher School of Coaches (Moscow)

External links
Fan website 
 Department of Football of the Russian State University of Physical Culture owns the club

Defunct football clubs in Moscow
1992 establishments in Russia